Play God may refer to:
 Play God (album), a 1991 album by Reverend
 "Play God" (song), a 2017 song by Sam Fender
 Play God, a 2016 EP by Ani DiFranco